Feritcan Şamlı (born 29 January 1994) is a Turkish cyclist, who currently rides for UCI Continental team .

Major results

2011
 1st  Time trial, National Junior Road Championships
2012
 1st  Time trial, National Under-23 Road Championships
2013
 3rd Time trial, National Road Championships
2014
 1st  Road race, National Road Championships
2015
 2nd Overall Tour of Aegean
 5th Overall Tour of Ankara
1st Stage 4
 8th Overall Tour of Çanakkale
2016
 2nd Time trial, National Road Championships
 9th Overall Tour of Ankara
1st Stage 1 (ITT)
2017
 2nd Time trial, National Road Championships
2018
 3rd Time trial, National Road Championships
2019
 1st  Turkish Beauties classification Presidential Tour of Turkey
 4th Road race, National Road Championships
2020
 5th Time trial, National Road Championships
 5th GP Manavgat

References

External links

1994 births
Living people
Turkish male cyclists
European Games competitors for Turkey
Cyclists at the 2019 European Games
Competitors at the 2018 Mediterranean Games
Mediterranean Games competitors for Turkey
Sportspeople from Istanbul
20th-century Turkish people
21st-century Turkish people